Lawalde is a municipality in the district Görlitz, in Saxony, Germany.

References

External links

 Official website (German only)

Populated places in Görlitz (district)